Jung Jin-young (born November 19, 1964) is a South Korean actor.

Film

As actor

As director

Television series

Web series

Variety show

References

South Korean filmographies